Samantha McClung is a New Zealand model and beauty pageant titleholder who was crowned Miss Universe New Zealand 2015 and represented her country at the Miss Universe 2015 pageant.

Personal life

Miss New Zealand 2015
McClung was crowned Miss New Zealand 2015 (also called Miss Universe New Zealand 2015) and represented Christchurch at the conclusion of the national pageant finals held on 24 October 2015. She succeeds Miss Universe New Zealand 2014 – Rachel Maree Millns. McClung competed at the Miss Universe 2015, received Miss Photogenic award but was Unplaced.

References

New Zealand beauty pageant winners
Living people
1994 births
New Zealand female models
Miss Universe 2015 contestants